Pluteus brunneidiscus is a species of agaric fungus in the family Pluteaceae. It was first described scientifically by American mycologist William Alphonso Murrill in 1917. It is found in Europe (Spain) and North America.

Description
Pileus and stipe without blue-green tinges. Specimens are small to medium-sized and have a brown pileus which is usually darker at the center.

Habitat and distribution
Solitary, on wood of broad-leaved trees. Found in the U.S. and in Spain from June to November.

Chemistry
These mushrooms contain psilocybin.

See also
List of Pluteus species

References

External links

Fungi described in 1917
Fungi of Europe
Fungi of North America
brunneidiscus
Psychoactive fungi
Psychedelic tryptamine carriers